Carll Smith Burr Jr. (September 26, 1858 in Commack, Suffolk County, New York – January 2, 1936 in Commack, Suffolk Co. NY) was an American politician from New York.

Life
He was the son of Carll S. Burr (1831–1916) and Emma Frances (Case) Burr (1839–1907). He attended Huntington Union School and Flushing Institute. Then he entered his father's business and became nationally known as a horse breeder. On November 18, 1885, he married Harriet E. Carll (1862–1945), and they had two children. He was a judge at the National Horse Shows of 1892, 1893 and 1894.

He was a delegate to the 1892 Republican National Convention. In the 1896 presidential election, he was a presidential elector for William McKinley and  Garret Hobart.

Burr Jr. was a member of the New York State Assembly (Suffolk Co., 2nd D.) in 1896, 1897 and 1898.

He was a member of the New York State Senate (1st D.) from 1905 to 1908, sitting in the 128th, 129th, 130th and 131st New York State Legislatures.

He was buried at the Commack Cemetery.

See also
 Carll S. Burr Mansion
 Carll Burr Jr. House

References
 Official New York from Cleveland to Hughes by Charles Elliott Fitch (Hurd Publishing Co., New York and Buffalo, 1911, Vol. IV; pg. 336, 339 and 365f)
 The New York Red Book compiled by Edgar L. Murlin (published by James B. Lyon, Albany NY, 1897; pg. 195f)
 CARLL BURR DEAD, EX-STATE SENATOR in NYT on January 3, 1936 (subscription required)
 Burr genealogy at Long Island surnames

External links

1858 births
1936 deaths
Republican Party New York (state) state senators
People from Commack, New York
Republican Party members of the New York State Assembly
1896 United States presidential electors